Whitpain Public School, also known as Whitpain High School and the 1895 School, is a historic school building located at Blue Bell, Montgomery County, Pennsylvania.  It was built in 1895, and is a two-story, stucco covered stone and brick building.  It is in a Late Victorian style with Queen Anne and Gothic Revival style details.  It measure 37 feet wide by 50 feet deep, and sits on a fieldstone foundation. It features an entrance porch and numerous Gothic arches.

It was added to the National Register of Historic Places in 2006.

References

School buildings on the National Register of Historic Places in Pennsylvania
Gothic Revival architecture in Pennsylvania
School buildings completed in 1895
Schools in Montgomery County, Pennsylvania
Whitpain Township, Pennsylvania
National Register of Historic Places in Montgomery County, Pennsylvania